Kalevala is an urban locality (an urban-type settlement) and the administrative center of Kalevalsky District in the Republic of Karelia, Russia. As of the 2010 Census, its population was 4,529.

History
It was named Ukhta until 1963, when it was renamed after the Finnish Kalevala epos. The poem collection was in part collected in Ukhta.

Administrative and municipal status
Within the framework of administrative divisions, Kalevala serves as the administrative center of Kalevalsky District, of which it is a part. As a municipal division, Kalevala, together with one rural locality (the settlement of Kuusiniyemi) is incorporated within Kalevalsky Municipal District as Kalevalskoye Urban Settlement.

Climate
Kalevala has a subarctic climate. Its climate is somewhat tempered by its relative proximity to mild marine areas, ensuring winters that are more habitable than areas further east. However, in spite of this, the winter season is dominant and summers are short and cool.

References

Notes

Sources

Urban-type settlements in the Republic of Karelia
Kalevalsky District
Kemsky Uyezd